Ernst Mayr's water rat (Leptomys ernstmayri) is a species of rodent in the family Muridae, named for evolutionary biologist Ernst Mayr.
It is found in the Foja Mountains of Papua Province, Indonesia, and in the mountains of northeastern Papua New Guinea.

References

Leptomys
Rodents of New Guinea
Mammals described in 1932
Taxonomy articles created by Polbot